The 2005 Kerry Senior Football Championship was the 105th staging of the Kerry Senior Football Championship since its establishment by the Kerry County Board in 1889. The draw for the opening round fixtures took place on 4 April 2005. The championship ran from 7 May to 13 November 2005.

South Kerry entered the championship as the defending champions.

The final was played on 13 November 2005 at FitzGerald Stadium in Killarney, between South Kerry and Dr. Crokes in what was their first ever meeting in the final. South Kerry won the match by 0-12 to 1-06 to claim their seventh championship title overall and a second title in succession.

Colm Cooper was the championship's top scorer with 5-19.

Team changes

To Championship

Promoted from the Kerry Intermediate Football Championship
 Dingle

Results

Round 1

 South Kerry, Laune Rangers, Milltown/Castlemaine and Dr. Crokes received byes to Round 3.

Round 2

Relegation playoff

Round 3

Quarter-finals

Semi-finals

Final

Championship statistics

Top scorers

Overall

In a single game

Miscellaneous

 An Ghaeltacht play in the Munster Senior Club Football Championship after winning the Kerry Club Football Championship.

References

Kerry Senior Football Championship
2005 in Gaelic football